Johannes Erik Eiel Sonck (25 August 1919 – 18 May 1952) was a Finnish athlete. He finished fifth in the triple jump at the 1946 European Championships and 17th in the decathlon at the 1948 Summer Olympics, where he served as the Finnish flag bearer at the opening ceremony.

References

1919 births
1952 deaths
Athletes (track and field) at the 1948 Summer Olympics
Olympic athletes of Finland
Finnish decathletes
Finnish male triple jumpers